Burkholderia ambifaria is a species of Pseudomonadota.

References

External links

Type strain of Burkholderia ambifaria at BacDive -  the Bacterial Diversity Metadatabase

Burkholderiaceae
Bacteria described in 2001